Hurry is a surname. Notable people with the surname include:

Andrew Hurry (born 1964), English cricket coach
John Hurry (1920–2015), British Royal Air Force officer
Paul Hurry (born 1975), British motorcycle speedway rider
Polly Hurry (1883–1963), Australian painter

See also
Urry